The Democratic Opposition of Serbia, commonly referred to as DOS, was a wide alliance of political parties in Serbia, intent on ousting the ruling Socialist Party and its leader, Slobodan Milošević.

History 
Its presidential candidate, Vojislav Koštunica, defeated Milošević in the 2000 general election, while the DOS secured a majority of seats in the National Assembly. The coalition was able to form a government and selected Zoran Đinđić for Prime Minister.

Koštunica's Democratic Party of Serbia left the coalition government in July 2001, in protest of the governments decision to extradite Slobodan Milošević to the ICTY, and officially left the coalition in July next year. Social democracy was pushed into the opposition in May 2001 after a split in the party, as the faction which was eventually recognized by the Supreme Court of Serbia as the legitimate name bearer, was not regarded as such by the DOS, which transferred all the positions held by the party members to the other faction's adherents. That faction, having not received the legal recognition, had merged in July 2002 with the Socialdemocratic Union into the Social Democratic Party. In March 2003, after a split in this party, the Socialdemocratic Union was renewed, still being a member of the DOS, while the Social Democratic Party was excluded from the coalition in November 2003, after having announced that it would support the opposition's demand for government's depose. In May 2003, New Serbia was excluded from the coalition after a series of conflicts with the other members. In 2003, New Democracy was renamed into the Liberals of Serbia, and the Association of Free and Independent Trade Unions founded the Labour Party of Serbia, to which it transferred its membership in the DOS.

Dragoljub Mićunović, the DOS candidate, performed poorly in the 2003 presidential election and was even beaten by 11% by Tomislav Nikolić, candidate of the nationalist Serbian Radical Party. Since only 38% of the electors voted, the presidential election was cancelled for the third time in a row. Therefore, the DOS was disbanded on 18 November 2003. The disbanding was mostly decided by the Democratic Party, the party founded by the then Prime Minister Zoran Đinđić, who was assassinated on 12 March 2003.

Member parties

Electoral results

FR Yugoslavia

Chamber of Citizens

President

Republic of Serbia

National Assembly

President

Positions held
Major positions held by Democratic Opposition of Serbia members:

See also
Overthrow of Slobodan Milošević

References

2000 establishments in Serbia
Defunct political party alliances in Serbia
Democracy movements
Overthrow of Slobodan Milošević
Political opposition organizations
Political parties disestablished in 2003
Political parties established in 2000